SodeTrav (Société Départementale de Transports du Var) is a bus operating in the south of France, specifically in the Var department. The company roots date to the early 20th century and it is now owned by the French transport group Keolis.

In 2008, SodeTrav had a fleet of over 180 vehicles.

Bus Lines
104
Saint Raphael - Frejus
Saint Aygult - Les Issambres
Sainte Maxime - Saint Pons
Port Grimaud - Grimaud
Cogolin - La Foux - Saint Tropez

100
Les Arcs - Saint Tropez

References

External links
SodeTrav Website (in French)

Bus companies of France